Fred Prosper Manget (21 January 1880 – 21 January 1979) was an American doctor, public servant, and medical missionary. He served for forty years in China from 1909 until the end of World War II. In 1909 Manget left the U.S. for China to pursue missionary work. He received recognition from state and local organizations for his service to the poor and elderly and for his Christian humanitarian efforts abroad. Manget is most notable for founding the Huzhou General Hospital in China. Huzhou General Hospital is specifically noted for its role in spreading western medical practices to northern China. He ran several clinics and dispensaries in his mission work as well as at home in the state of Georgia.

Early life 
Manget was born on 21 January 1880 to Elizabeth DePass and Victor Eugene Manget of Marietta, Georgia. His parents inspired Manget and his sister Jennie to devote their lives to the missionary work.  At the age of 12, Manget decided to become a medical missionary.

Education 
Fred Manget received his medical degree from the Atlanta College of Physicians and Surgeons (now Emory University School of Medicine) in 1906. He then took on an internship position at Grady Hospital in Atlanta. He later concluded his postgraduate work at Johns Hopkins University.

Missionary career

Early years in China 
In 1909 Manget left for China to pursue missionary work. During his first year, he was stationed in Suzhou, a major city in the southeastern Jiangsu province of East China. He later went to Huzhou, located within the very small province of Zhejiang, China, where he opened a dispensary in a rented property. This dispensary became the first hospital established in Huzhou, China. He served as superintendent at this dispensary until 1941. After receiving aid from the Chinese, Manget was able to open up 200-bed hospital in May 1924. Manget served as superintendent of the hospital until 1941. During 1918, he served with the American Red Cross as Head Medical Officer in Siberia. There he evacuated sick and wounded Czech soldier prisoners. As a result of his service, in Russia, he was adorned by Admiral Kolchak's government.

World War II 
Manget was asked to serve in the United States Public Health Commission as Senior Surgeon on Field Duty, during World War II. During his time as commissioner, he served in Burma and West China as a missionary aide to people with malaria. In 1941 he was asked to treat patients with malaria at the request of Chiang Kaishek, the Former President of the Republic of China. After Burma fell to the Japanese, he was later transferred to an area in southwest China called Kunming. In Kunming, Manget worked alongside General Claire Lee Chennault and the First American Volunteer Group of the Chinese Air Force also known as the Flying Tigers. While working with the “Flying Tigers”, Manget met Robert Lee Scott Jr.,a brigadier general in the U.S. air force during the war. It was with Colonel Robert Lee Scott Jr., that Manget coined the term "God is my co-pilot". This term later became the title of Scott's autobiography, which discussed his journeys as a pilot during World War II with the Flying Tigers and U.S. Air Force.
 Nurse Rebecca Chan Chung worked under Manget in Kunming.

HuzHou General Hospital 
At the end of World War I, Dr. Manget returned to Shanghai and discussed with the representative of The Rockefeller Foundation in China about the Foundation’s intention to spread the practice of Western medicine in China. After much negotiation, the Chinese Government agreed to provide nine acres of land, while the foundation provided US$30,000 to build a hospital in Huzhou. The remaining needed funds for the project were provided by the Southern Methodist Church and the Northern Baptist Church in the USA.

Huzhou General Hospital was a small hospital in a small rented building. It was first established with Dr. Manget as the only physician; later encompassing nine acres of land, and with a staff of over 100 nurses and 100 other personnel. At its time, it was noted for being the most modern medical facilities in China. The facilities of the hospital included a chemistry laboratory, an X-ray facility and a nursing school. Japanese troops later occupied the hospital. During this time, Manget's family left China. However, Dr. Manget was not willing to leave China because of the harsh treatment of the Chinese people by the Japanese. As a result of pointing out these injustices, he was arrested by Japanese troops, who wrongly accused him of espionage. Manget was later released and was able to work under the strict control of the Japanese troops at Huzhou General Hospital for an additional three and a half years.

Manget Foundation 
After returning to home to Georgia in the 1950s, Manget accepted the presidency of the Manget Foundation. The Manget Foundation in Newnan, Georgia was founded in 1949 by Fred Prosper Manget's brother, Dan Manget. At the Manget Foundation, Fred Prosper Manget operated a clinic and provided free medical care to those unable to afford it. In 1952, Manget received an honorary degree from LaGrange College for his Christian humanitarian work.

Christian Youth Church
During the time from 1953 to 1961, Manget ran a clinic out of the Christian Youth Church on Capitol Avenue in Atlanta where he provided medical care every Saturday to patients.

Personal life 
Manget's first wife was Louise Anderson. Fred and Louise had four daughters during their time in China, Elizabeth DePasse Manget in 1910, Jean Logan Manget in 1912, Louise and Mildred Bomar Manget in 1920. Anderson later died in 1957. He later remarried Jennie Loyall Anderson of Macon, Georgia in 1959. His second wife died in 1976. Dr.Manget was later admitted to Wesley Woods Health Center in Atlanta in 1978. Manget died on 21 January 1979.

References 

1880 births
1979 deaths
Physicians from Georgia (U.S. state)
Medical missionaries
Flying Tigers
20th-century Chinese physicians